The Peruvian warbling antbird (Hypocnemis peruviana) is a species of bird in the family Thamnophilidae. It was considered a subspecies of Hypocnemis cantator, but based on vocal differences and to a lesser degree differences in plumages, it has been recommended that they be treated as separate species. As presently defined, the Peruvian warbling antbird includes a single subspecies, saturata. It has a black, white, and grey head and breast, with rufous flanks and a dull brown lower back and tail.

The Peruvian warbling antbird is found at lower levels in humid forest in south-eastern Colombia, eastern Ecuador, eastern Peru, northern Bolivia and western Brazil. It is locally sympatric with the yellow-breasted warbling antbird.

References

 Isler, Isler, & Whitney. 2007. Species limits in antbirds (Thamnophilidae): The Warbling Antbird (Hypocnemis cantator) complex. The Auk. 124(1): 11–28.
 Zimmer & Isler. 2003. Hypocnemis cantator (Warbling Antbird). Pp. 645 in del Hoyo, Elliott, & Christie. 2003. Handbook of the Birds of the World. Vol. 8. Broadbills to Tapaculos. Lynx Edicions. Barcelona.
 Split Hypocnemis cantator by elevating H. flavescens, peruviana, subflava, ochrogyna and striata to species rank. South American Classification Committee. Accessed 2008-06-27
 Peruvian Warbling-Antbird. arthurgrosset.com. Accessed 2008-06-27

Peruvian warbling antbird
Birds of the Ecuadorian Amazon
Birds of the Peruvian Amazon
Birds of the Amazon Basin
Peruvian warbling antbird